Carlos Leon is an American Paralympic track and field athlete who competes in men's shot put.

Leon is a United States Marine Corps veteran who competed for Team USA at the 2008 Summer Paralympics in the shot put F53/54 event.

The documentary film Warrior Champions: From Baghdad to Beijing features Leon's individual story as he trained to try for a berth on the 2008 U.S. Paralympic team.

References

Living people
Paralympic track and field athletes of the United States
Place of birth missing (living people)
Year of birth missing (living people)
Athletes (track and field) at the 2008 Summer Paralympics
American male shot putters
Medalists at the 2007 Parapan American Games